Telmatobius jelskii, also known as the Acancocha water frog, is a near-threatened species of frog in the family Telmatobiidae, endemic to the Andes of central Peru. It breeds in streams.

References

Jelskii
Endemic fauna of Peru
Amphibians of Peru
Amphibians of the Andes
Taxonomy articles created by Polbot
Amphibians described in 1873
Taxa named by Wilhelm Peters